The 2001–02 daytime network television schedule for the six major English-language commercial broadcast networks in the United States in operation during that television season covers the weekday daytime hours from September 2001 to August 2002. The schedule is followed by a list per network of returning series, new series, and series canceled after the 2000–01 season.

Affiliates fill time periods not occupied by network programs with local or syndicated programming. PBS – which offers daytime programming through a children's program block, PBS Kids – is not included, as its member television stations have local flexibility over most of their schedules and broadcast times for network shows may vary. Also not included are stations affiliated with Pax TV, as its schedule is composed mainly of syndicated reruns although it also carried some first-run programs.

The September 11 attacks hindered the ability to start airing daytime programming in a timely manner.

Legend

 New series are highlighted in bold.

Schedule
 All times correspond to U.S. Eastern and Pacific Time scheduling (except for some live sports or events). Except where affiliates slot certain programs outside their network-dictated timeslots, subtract one hour for Central, Mountain, Alaska, and Hawaii-Aleutian times.
 Local schedules may differ, as affiliates have the option to pre-empt or delay network programs. Such scheduling may be limited to preemptions caused by local or national breaking news or weather coverage (which may force stations to tape delay certain programs in overnight timeslots or defer them to a co-operated or other contracted station in their regular timeslot) and any major sports events scheduled to air in a weekday timeslot (mainly during major holidays). Stations may air shows at other times at their preference.

Monday-Friday

Notes
 † Fox returned its daytime programming hours back to its affiliates when Fox Kids ended its weekday block in December 2001. Many Fox affiliates preempted kids programming in daytime or deferred it to other television stations, opting to air syndicated programs or local news instead. 
 On September 11, 2001, all six major networks suspended their daytime programing due to live coverage of the September 11 attacks. Daytime programming resumed for Fox and The WB on September 12, while the Big Three networks resumed their regular daytime programs during the week of September 17. UPN, which did not carry any daytime programming at the time, resumed normal programming on September 13.

Saturday
{| class=wikitable style="font-size:90%"
! width="1.5%" bgcolor="#C0C0C0" colspan="2"|Network
! width="4%" bgcolor="#C0C0C0"|7:00 am
! width="4%" bgcolor="#C0C0C0"|7:30 am
! width="4%" bgcolor="#C0C0C0"|8:00 am
! width="4%" bgcolor="#C0C0C0"|8:30 am
! width="4%" bgcolor="#C0C0C0"|9:00 am
! width="4%" bgcolor="#C0C0C0"|9:30 am
! width="4%" bgcolor="#C0C0C0"|10:00 am
! width="4%" bgcolor="#C0C0C0"|10:30 am
! width="4%" bgcolor="#C0C0C0"|11:00 am
! width="4%" bgcolor="#C0C0C0"|11:30 am
! width="4%" bgcolor="#C0C0C0"|noon
! width="4%" bgcolor="#C0C0C0"|12:30 pm
! width="4%" bgcolor="#C0C0C0"|1:00 pm
! width="4%" bgcolor="#C0C0C0"|1:30 pm
! width="4%" bgcolor="#C0C0C0"|2:00 pm
! width="4%" bgcolor="#C0C0C0"|2:30 pm
! width="4%" bgcolor="#C0C0C0"|3:00 pm
! width="4%" bgcolor="#C0C0C0"|3:30 pm
! width="4%" bgcolor="#C0C0C0"|4:00 pm
! width="4%" bgcolor="#C0C0C0"|4:30 pm
! width="4%" bgcolor="#C0C0C0"|5:00 pm
! width="4%" bgcolor="#C0C0C0"|5:30 pm
! width="4%" bgcolor="#C0C0C0"|6:00 pm
! width="4%" bgcolor="#C0C0C0"|6:30 pm
|-
! bgcolor="#C0C0C0" rowspan="6"|ABC
! Fall
| bgcolor="white" colspan="2" rowspan="6"|Local and/orsyndicatedprogramming
| bgcolor="bf9fef" rowspan="1"|House of Mouse
| bgcolor="bf9fef" rowspan="1"|The New Adventures of Winnie the Pooh
| bgcolor="bf9fef" rowspan="1"|Teacher's Pet
| bgcolor="bf9fef" rowspan="1"|Lloyd in Space
| colspan="2" rowspan="1" bgcolor="bf9fef" |Recess
| bgcolor="bf9fef" rowspan="1"|Lizzie McGuire
| bgcolor="bf9fef" rowspan="1"|Even Stevens
| bgcolor="bf9fef" rowspan="1"|Sabrina: The Animated Series
| bgcolor="bf9fef" rowspan="1"|The Weekenders
| bgcolor="99ccff" colspan="12" rowspan="2"|College Football on ABC
|-
! October
| bgcolor="bf9fef" rowspan="1"|Teacher's Pet
| bgcolor="bf9fef" rowspan="1"|Lloyd in Space
| colspan="2" rowspan="5" bgcolor="bf9fef" |Recess
| bgcolor="bf9fef" rowspan="5"|Lizzie McGuire
| bgcolor="bf9fef" rowspan="5"|Even Stevens
| bgcolor="bf9fef" rowspan="1"|Mary-Kate and Ashley in Action!
| bgcolor="bf9fef" rowspan="2"|The Weekenders
| bgcolor="bf9fef" rowspan="5"|The New Adventures of Winnie the Pooh
| bgcolor="bf9fef" rowspan="5"|House of Mouse
|-
! December 
| bgcolor="bf9fef" rowspan="3"|Mary-Kate and Ashley in Action!
| bgcolor="bf9fef" rowspan="4"|Teacher's Pet
| bgcolor="bf9fef" rowspan="2"|Lloyd in Space
| bgcolor="99ccff" colspan="4" rowspan="4"|ABC Sports and/or local programming
| bgcolor="99ccff" colspan="6" rowspan="4"|ABC Sports programming
| bgcolor="gold" rowspan="4"|Local news
| bgcolor="gold" rowspan="4"|ABC World News Saturday
|-
! Winter
| bgcolor="bf9fef" rowspan="1"|Teamo Supremo
|-
! Spring
| bgcolor="bf9fef" rowspan="2"|Teamo Supremo
| bgcolor="bf9fef" rowspan="2"|Lloyd in Space
|-
! August
| bgcolor="bf9fef" rowspan="1"|Teamo Supremo
|-
! bgcolor="#C0C0C0" rowspan="2"|CBS
! Fall
| bgcolor="bf9fef" rowspan="1"|Oswald
| bgcolor="bf9fef" rowspan="2"|Dora the Explorer
| bgcolor="bf9fef" rowspan="2"|Blue's Clues
| bgcolor="bf9fef" rowspan="2"|Little Bill
| bgcolor="gold" colspan="4" rowspan="2"|The Saturday Early Show
| bgcolor="bf9fef" rowspan="2"|Franklin
| bgcolor="bf9fef" rowspan="1"|Bob the Builder
| bgcolor="99ccff" rowspan="1" colspan="16"|SEC on CBS
|-
! Spring
| bgcolor="bf9fef" rowspan="1"|Bob the Builder
| bgcolor="bf9fef" rowspan="1"|Oswald
| bgcolor="99ccff" colspan="6"|CBS Sports and/or local programming
| bgcolor="99ccff" colspan="6"|CBS Sports programming
| bgcolor="gold"|Local news
| bgcolor="gold"|CBS Evening News
|-
! bgcolor="#C0C0C0" rowspan="2"|NBC
! Fall
| bgcolor="white" rowspan="2"colspan="2"|Local and/orsyndicatedprogramming
| bgcolor="gold" rowspan="2"colspan="4"|Today
| bgcolor="bf9fef"rowspan="2"|City Guys
| bgcolor="bf9fef"rowspan="2"|All About Us
| bgcolor="bf9fef"rowspan="2"|Just Deal
| bgcolor="bf9fef"rowspan="1"|Sk8
| bgcolor="bf9fef"rowspan="1"|City Guys
| bgcolor="bf9fef"rowspan="2"|NBA Inside Stuff
| bgcolor="99ccff" rowspan="2"colspan="4"|NBC Sports and/or local programming
| bgcolor="99ccff" rowspan="2"colspan="6"|NBC Sports programming
| bgcolor="gold"rowspan="2"|Local news
| bgcolor="gold"rowspan="2"|NBC Nightly News
|-
! Winter
| bgcolor="bf9fef"rowspan="1"|City Guys
| bgcolor="bf9fef"rowspan="1"|Sk8
|-
! bgcolor="#C0C0C0" rowspan="5"|Fox
! Fall
| bgcolor="white" colspan="2" rowspan="5"|Local and/orsyndicatedprogramming
| bgcolor="bf9fef" rowspan="3"|Transformers: Robots in Disguise
| bgcolor="bf9fef" rowspan="2"|Power Rangers Time Force
| bgcolor="bf9fef" rowspan="4"|Digimon: Digital Monsters
| bgcolor="bf9fef" rowspan="2"|Medabots
| bgcolor="bf9fef" rowspan="1"|Moolah Beach
| bgcolor="bf9fef" rowspan="3"|Digimon: Digital Monsters
| bgcolor="bf9fef" rowspan="1"|The Ripping Friends
| bgcolor="bf9fef" rowspan="4"|Alienators: Evolution Continues
| bgcolor="99ccff" rowspan="4"colspan="14"|Fox Sports and/or local programming
|-
! October
| bgcolor="bf9fef" rowspan="1"|The Ripping Friends
| bgcolor="bf9fef" rowspan="3"|Mon Colle Knights
|-
! February
| bgcolor="bf9fef" rowspan="3"|Power Rangers Wild Force
| bgcolor="bf9fef" rowspan="1"|Galidor: Defenders of the Outer Dimension
| bgcolor="bf9fef" rowspan="1"|Medabots
|-
! March
| bgcolor="bf9fef" rowspan="1"|Galidor: Defenders of the Outer Dimension
| bgcolor="bf9fef" rowspan="1"|Medabots
| bgcolor="bf9fef" rowspan="1"|Digimon: Digital Monsters
| bgcolor="bf9fef" rowspan="1"|Transformers: Robots in Disguise
|-
! May
| bgcolor="bf9fef" rowspan="1"|The New Woody Woodpecker Show
| bgcolor="bf9fef" rowspan="1"|Galidor: Defenders of the Outer Dimension
| bgcolor="bf9fef" rowspan="1"|Digimon: Digital Monsters
| bgcolor="bf9fef" rowspan="1"|Medabots
| bgcolor="bf9fef" rowspan="1"|Digimon: Digital Monsters
| bgcolor="bf9fef" rowspan="1"|Transformers: Robots in Disguise
| bgcolor="bf9fef" rowspan="1"|Mon Colle Knights
| bgcolor="white" rowspan="1"|Local and/orsyndicatedprogramming
| bgcolor="99ccff" rowspan="1"|This Week in Baseball
| bgcolor="99ccff" rowspan="1"colspan="12"|Fox Sports and/or local programming
|-
! bgcolor="#C0C0C0" rowspan="5"|The WB
! Fall
| bgcolor="white" colspan="2" rowspan="5"|Local and/orsyndicated programming
| bgcolor="bf9fef" rowspan="1"|Pokémon
| bgcolor="bf9fef" rowspan="1"|Cubix: Robots for Everyone
| bgcolor="bf9fef" rowspan="5"|Jackie Chan Adventures
| bgcolor="bf9fef" rowspan="2"|The Mummy
| bgcolor="bf9fef" rowspan="5"|Pokémon
| bgcolor="bf9fef" rowspan="3"|X-Men: Evolution
| bgcolor="bf9fef" rowspan="2"|The Nightmare Room
| bgcolor="bf9fef" rowspan="3"|Yu-Gi-Oh!
| bgcolor="white" colspan="18" rowspan="5"|Local and/orsyndicated programming
|-
! January
| bgcolor="bf9fef" rowspan="1"|Cubix: Robots for Everyone
| bgcolor="bf9fef" rowspan="4"|Static Shock
|-
! March
| bgcolor="bf9fef" rowspan="1"|X-Men: Evolution
| bgcolor="bf9fef" rowspan="1"|The Zeta Project
| bgcolor="bf9fef" rowspan="1"|The Mummy
|-
! June
| bgcolor="bf9fef" rowspan="1"|Rescue Heroes: Global Response Team
| bgcolor="bf9fef" rowspan="1"|The Powerpuff Girls
| bgcolor="bf9fef" rowspan="2"|Yu-Gi-Oh!
| bgcolor="bf9fef" rowspan="1"|X-Men: Evolution
| bgcolor="bf9fef" rowspan="1"|Phantom Investigators
|-
! July
| bgcolor="bf9fef" rowspan="1"|The Zeta Project
| bgcolor="bf9fef" rowspan="1"|Jackie Chan Adventures
| bgcolor="bf9fef" rowspan="1"|Yu-Gi-Oh!
| bgcolor="bf9fef" rowspan="1"|X-Men: Evolution|}

Sunday

By network
ABC

Returning series:ABC World News Tonight with Peter JenningsAll My ChildrenGeneral HospitalGood Morning AmericaHouse of MouseLloyd in SpaceThe New Adventures of Winnie the Pooh (reruns)One Life to LivePort CharlesRecessSabrina: The Animated SeriesTeacher's PetThis Week with Sam & CokieThe ViewThe WeekendersNew series:Even StevensLizzie McGuireMary-Kate and Ashley in Action!Teamo SupremoNot returning from 2000–01:Buzz Lightyear of Star CommandDoug (reruns)Mickey Mouse WorksPepper AnnCBS

Returning series:As the World TurnsBlue's CluesThe Bold and the BeautifulDora the ExplorerThe Early ShowCBS Evening News with Dan RatherCBS News Sunday MorningFace the NationFranklinGuiding LightLittle BillThe Price is RightThe Saturday Early ShowThe Young and the RestlessNew series:Bob the BuilderOswaldNot returning from 2000–01:KipperLittle BearNBC

Returning series:All About UsCity GuysDays of Our LivesJust DealMeet the PressNBA Inside StuffNBC Nightly News with Tom BrokawPassionsTodayNew series:Sk8Not returning from 2000–01:Hang TimeOne WorldFox

Returning series:Action ManDigimon: Digital MonstersFox News SundayLife with Louie (reruns)The Magic School Bus (reruns)The New Woody Woodpecker ShowPower Rangers Time ForceNew series:Alienators: Evolution ContinuesGalidor: Defenders of the Outer DimensionMedabotsMon Colle KnightsMoolah BeachPower Rangers Wild ForceThe Ripping FriendsTransformers: Robots in DisguiseNot returning from 2000–01:Beast Machines: TransformersBig Guy and Rusty the Boy RobotCybersix (from fall 1999)DinozaursDungeons & DragonsEscaflowneFlint the Time DetectiveKong: The Animated SeriesLos LuchadoresNASCAR RacersPower Rangers Lightspeed RescueReal Scary StoriesRoswell ConspiraciesSpider-Man UnlimitedX-Men (reruns)The Zack FilesUPN

Returning series:Buzz Lightyear of Star CommandRecessSabrina: The Animated SeriesNew series:The Legend of TarzanThe WeekendersNot returning from 2000–01:Pepper AnnThe WB

Returning series:Batman BeyondCardcaptorsCubix: Robots for EveryoneJackie Chan AdventuresPokémon: Johto League ChampionsRescue Heroes: Global Response TeamStatic ShockX-Men: EvolutionThe Zeta ProjectNew series:The MummyThe Nightmare RoomPhantom InvestigatorsThe Powerpuff GirlsSailor MoonScooby-DooYu-Gi-Oh!Not returning from 2000–01:DetentionDragon Ball ZGeneration O!Histeria!Max SteelMen in Black: The SeriesThe Sylvester & Tweety Mysteries''

See also
2001–02 United States network television schedule (prime-time)
2001–02 United States network television schedule (late night)

References

Sources
https://web.archive.org/web/20071015122215/http://curtalliaume.com/abc_day.html
https://web.archive.org/web/20071015122235/http://curtalliaume.com/cbs_day.html
https://web.archive.org/web/20071012211242/http://curtalliaume.com/nbc_day.html

United States weekday network television schedules
2001 in American television
2002 in American television
Impact of the September 11 attacks on television